Kenneth Ross MacKenzie (June 15, 1912 – July 4, 2002) together with Dale R. Corson and Emilio Segrè, synthesized the element astatine, in 1940.  MacKenzie received his PhD under Ernest Lawrence at Lawrence Livermore National Laboratory. Lawrence, MacKenzie, and their colleagues devised the first cyclotron.  He was a professor of physics at UCLA, where he and Reg Richardson built UCLA's first cyclotron and later a bevatron.  MacKenzie devised MacKenzie buckets which are plasma sources created by lining vacuum chamber walls with permanent magnets of alternating polarity to suppress plasma electron losses, that are widely used to this day.  He later traveled around the world, helping to troubleshoot various country's cyclotron problems.  Later in life, he studied plasma physics and dark matter.

Help with the Manhattan Project
Dr. K. R. Mackenzie’s family moved to Victoria, British Columbia when he was age 10. He received his bachelors and masters degree from the University of British Columbia, and began further study at the University of California, Berkeley in 1937. As a graduate student, Kenneth Ross Mackenzie was involved in the Manhattan Project to help solve how to separate the rare uranium-235 isotope from the identical dominant uranium-238 isotope at Oak Ridge, Tennessee. As an interesting side note, while working on the Manhattan project, MacKenzie and colleagues borrowed 14,700 tons of silver from the US Treasury and melted it into strands to replace old copper in their magnetic coils. After the war, the silver was melted and returned to the treasury.

Other roles
As an actor, he played minor roles with Yvonne De Carlo in Ride the Pink Horse (1947), River Lady (1948) and Black Bart (1948).

He died in Los Angeles on 4 July 2002 at aged 90.

References

External links
 

1912 births
2002 deaths
20th-century American physicists
American nuclear physicists
Discoverers of chemical elements
Scientists from Portland, Oregon
Manhattan Project people